Øvre Sandsvær is a former municipality in Buskerud county, Norway. Its name translates to Upper Sandsvær.

History
From 1837, Øvre Sandsvær was a part of the Sandsvær presidency. The kommune was created on January 1, 1908, when Sandsvær was split into Øvre Sandsvær and Ytre Sandsvær. In 1939, one of the municipalities' districts was moved into the Flesberg municipality. On January 1, 1964, Øvre and Ytre Sandsvær were incorporated into the Kongsberg municipality.

Population
At the time of its creation in 1908, Øvre Sandsvær had a population of 2,464. In 1939, its population was 2,431. In 1964, just before it ceased to be recognized as a municipality, it had a population of 2,854.

References

External links
List of people in Øvre Sandsvær in 1910

Former municipalities of Norway